Olaf Schaftenaar (born 15 May 1993) is a Dutch professional basketball player for Donar of the BNXT League. He played collegiately with Oregon State before returning to the Netherlands to play professionally for Landstede Hammers. Schaftenaar also plays for the Netherlands national team.

College career
He was a four year player at Oregon State. In his senior year, he averaged 6.4 points and 2.9 rebounds per game.

Professional career
On 19 September 2016, Schaftenaar signed with Landstede Basketbal. He was named DBL Rookie of the Year after the 2016–17 DBL regular season.

In his second season, Schaftenaar and Landstede started the season by winning the Dutch Supercup on 5 October 2017. On 1 June 2019, Schaftenaar won the DBL championship with Landstede, the first in club history.

On 4 June 2019, Schaftenaar signed with Real Canoe of the Spanish LEB Oro for the 2019–20 season.

On 23 July 2020, Schaftenaar signed with Bàsquet Girona of the LEB Oro. He averaged 5.7 points and 2.2 rebounds per game in 16 games. On 26, February 2022, Schaftenaar signed with CSU Sibiu of the Liga Națională. He averaged 5.3 points on 41.3% shooting in 10 games with Sibiu.

On 10 July 2022, he signed with Donar, returning to the Netherlands after three years abroad.

National team career 
Schaftenaar played for the Netherlands' Under-18 and Under-20 teams. He later made his debut for the Netherlands senior team, first appearing for his country on 6 July 2017 against Bulgaria. He was on the 12-man roster for EuroBasket 2022.

Personal life
Olaf is the son of Philip, who played professional basketball in the Eredivisie, and the younger brother of Oregon State alum and professional player Roeland Schaftenaar.

References

External links
Oregon State Beavers profile

1993 births
Living people
Donar (basketball club) players
Dutch expatriate basketball people in Spain
Dutch expatriate basketball people in the United States
Dutch men's basketball players
Landstede Hammers players
Oregon State Beavers men's basketball players
Power forwards (basketball)
Real Canoe NC basketball players
Sportspeople from Utrecht (city)